Certified Management Accountant (CMA) is a professional certification credential in the management accounting and financial management fields. The certification signifies that the person possesses knowledge in the areas of financial planning, analysis, control, decision support, and professional ethics. There are many professional bodies globally that have management accounting professional qualifications. The main bodies that offer the CMA certification are:

 Institute of Management Accountants USA; 
 Institute of Certified Management Accountants (Australia); and 
 Certified Management Accountants of Canada.

Since the Canadian body merged with the CPA Canada in September 2015, there are only 2 global bodies that offer the CMA certification, IMA (USA) and ICMA (Australia). However, the certification pathways for the two bodies – in terms of entry requirements, study syllabi and experience requirements are very different and will be explored next.

The U.S. based Institute of Management Accountants USA is one of the two global bodies that offers the CMA Certification. Only authorized partners of IMA can provide coaching to students for CMA USA. CMA (USA)-certified professionals work inside organizations of all sizes, industries, and types, including manufacturing and services, public and private enterprises, not-for-profit organizations, academic institutions, Government entities (USA), and multinational corporations worldwide. To obtain certification, candidates must pass a rigorous exam, meet an educational requirement, experience requirement, and demonstrate a commitment to continuous learning through continuing professional education (CPE).

The Certified Management Accountant (USA) Exam
Prior to 2010, the CMA exam was organized into four parts: Business Analysis, Management Accounting and Reporting, Strategic Management and Decision Analysis. Since 2010, the exam has been condensed into two four-hour parts, covering largely the same material as the former four part exam with added emphasis on financial planning, analysis, control, and decision support.

Each exam consists of descriptive questions and two 30-minute essay questions. Candidates are given 3 hours to complete the multiple choice section and one hour to complete the essays. Candidates must show their work for the essay questions in order to receive credit.  Parts 1 and 2 of the CMA exam are scored on a scale of 0–500 with a candidate's raw score converted to a uniform scaled score against all exam candidates. On this scale, a score of 360 represents the minimum passing scaled score.

Exam Content
Part 1 – Financial Planning, Performance, and Analytics.
 External financial reporting decisions (15%)
 Planning, budgeting and forecasting (20%)
 Performance management (20%)
 Cost management (15%)
 Internal controls (15%)
 Technology and Analytics (15%)

Part 2 – Strategic Financial Management
 Financial statement analysis (20%)
 Corporate finance (20%)
 Decision analysis (25%)
 Risk management (10%)
 Investment decisions (10%)
 Professional ethics (15%)

Additional Certification Requirements
In addition to successfully passing the exams, CMA candidates must fulfill education and experience requirements in order to be certified:

1. Bachelor's degree from an accredited college or university

2. Two continuous years of professional experience employing the principles of management accounting and financial management including:
 Preparation of financial statements
 Financial planning & analysis
 Monthly, quarterly, and year end close
 Auditing (external or internal)
 Budget preparation & reporting
 Manage general ledger and balance sheets
 Forecasting
 Company investment decision making
 Costing analysis
 Risk evaluation

3. For certified CMAs, 30 hours of CPE credits, including two hours of ethics, and annual IMA Membership are required to maintain active status.
In September 2021, IMA announced the historic milestone of awarding 100,000 CMA certifications.

The Certified Management Accountant (Australia) Exam 
The Institute of Certified Management Accountants (ICMA) is an Australian organisation operating globally, focused on management accounting. A management accountant applies his or her professional knowledge and skill in the preparation and presentation of financial and other decision-oriented information in such a way as to assist management in the formulation of policies and in the planning and control of the operation of the undertaking.

Management Accountants therefore are seen as the "value-creators" amongst the accountants. They are much more interested in forward looking and taking decisions that will affect the future of the organization, than in the historical recording and compliance (scorekeeping) aspects of the profession. Management accounting knowledge and experience can therefore be obtained from varied fields and functions within an organization, such as information management, treasury, efficiency auditing, marketing, valuation, pricing, logistics, etc.

Education Program 
ICMA (Australia) is committed to scholarship and quality education at the lowest possible cost to its students. The educational objectives of the Institute of Certified Management Accountants (ICMA) are therefore to further the development of management accounting education in the universities and business schools of Australia and Internationally, to encourage research into the application of management accounting theory and practice, and to provide continuing professional development for its members.

In order to achieve the above objectives, the following educational programmes have been implemented by the institute.

Technician Level Programmes 
These programmes cover the three technician-level qualifications of ICMA:

 Certified Accounting Technician (CAT)
 Registered Cost Accountant (RCA)
 Registered Business Accountant (RBA)

There are 4-Stages in the Technician-Level Programs, consisting of 4-Subjects each as follows:

Stage 1 

 Organizational Management
 Accounting Principles & Practice
 Accounting Control Systems
 Financial Information Systems

Stage 2 

 Financial Economics
 International Business Law & Governance
 Business Analysis & Audit
 International Business Taxation

Stage 3 

 Financial Accounting
 Marketing Management
 Information Management
 Strategic Management

Stage 4 

 Financial Management
 Financial Statement Analysis
 Financial Modelling
 Managerial Accounting

Professional Level Programmes 
These programmes cover the professional-level qualifications of ICMA

 Graduate Management Accountant (GMA)
 Associate Management Accountant (AMA)
 Certified Management Accountant (CMA)

These certifications are only open to degree holders. Those holding an accounting/finance degree (or equivalent professional qualification) are exempt from all four stages of the Technician-level program and can advance directly to the CMA program. Those holding a non-accounting/finance degree or professional qualification need to undertake a Graduate Conversion program (Stage 4) prior to undertaking the CMA program

Graduate Conversion Program (for Non-Accounting Graduates/ Non-Accounting Professionals). 
Students who have obtained a non-accounting degree, or are full members of recognized professional non-accounting bodies (e.g., Chartered Institute of Marketing) would have satisfied the broad educational objectives to enrol in the Graduate Conversion programme -which is to complete Stage 4 of the GMA programme prior to undertaking the CMA program. A student completing the Graduate Conversion programme is eligible to join as a Graduate Management Accountant (GMA).

A student completing the Graduate Management Accountant (GMA) program and having 3 years or more of business experience is eligible to join as an Associate Management Accountant (AMA). Such students can enrol for the post-graduate level CMA program at any time; but must successfully complete this program and also accumulate 5-years of business experience to be eligible to join as a Certified Management Accountant (CMA).

CMA Program (for Accounting Graduates/Professional Accountants) 
The flagship CMA Preparatory Program consists of two subjects:

 Strategic Cost Management
 Strategic Business Analysis

The CMA program from Australia is designed as the first post-graduate level management accounting qualification in the world. There are other unique aspects to ICMA's Education program. It was the first professional body in the world to embed its CMA subjects within master's degree programs in accredited universities; and allow those universities to examine students internally.

Entry Criteria for CMA (Australia) Program 
The CMA Preparatory Program is only open to those with a university degree in accounting or finance; or an MBA, or a recognised professional qualification in accounting/finance. Those not meeting these entry criteria need to complete the Graduate Management Accountant (GMA) or GMA Conversion program first.

Assessments 
Those undertaking course at an ICMA Recognised Provider Institution are all examined by the ICMA: 

[A student must obtain a 50% pass grade, in the final assessment to pass the subject. Students obtaining less than 50% in the final assessment would Fail the subject.]

Additional Certification Requirements 
In addition to passing the two subjects, one needs to have 5-years of business experience to qualify as a Certified Management Accountant (CMA).

See also
 Chartered Institute of Management Accountants (CIMA UK, Designation is ACMA or FCMA) - UK, Europe, International
 Certified Management Accountants of Canada (Designation as CMA, FCMA)
 Certified Public Accountant - USA
 Uniform Certified Public Accountant Examination - USA
 Chartered Financial Analyst - USA
 Certified International Investment Analyst - Europe, International
 Certified European Financial Analyst - Europe
 Institute of Cost and Management Accountants of Pakistan (ICMAP - Designation as ACMA, FCMA)
 Institute of Certified Management Accountants (ICMA Australia) - Australia, Asia-Pacific, International
 Institute of Cost Accountants of India (ICAI, Designation is ACMA or FCMA) - India
 Institute of Management Accountants (IMA USA) - USA, China, International
Institute of Cost and Management Accountants of Bangladesh (Designation is ACMA or FCMA)ICMAB Bangladesh
 Institute of Certified Management Accountants (CMA SL Sri Lanka) - Sri Lanka <http://www.cma-srilanka.org/>

References

Accounting qualifications
Accounting in the United States
Management accounting